Sudbury is a federal electoral district in Ontario, Canada, that has been represented in the House of Commons of Canada since 1949. The district is one of two serving the city of Greater Sudbury, Ontario.

Geography

Sudbury electoral district consists of the part of the City of Greater Sudbury bounded on the west and south by the Greater Sudbury city limits, and on the north and east by a line drawn from the western city limit of Greater Sudbury east along the northern limit of the former Town of Walden, north, east and south along the limits of the former City of Sudbury, west along Highway 69 and Regent Street, south along Long Lake Road, west along the northern boundary of the Township of Broder, southwest along Kelly Lake, and south along the eastern limit of the former Town of Walden to the southern city limit of Greater Sudbury.

History
Sudbury electoral district was created in 1947 from part of the Nipissing riding. It consisted initially of the city of Sudbury and a part of the territorial district of Sudbury. 
 
In 1952, the boundaries were narrowed significantly to include only the city of Sudbury, the geographic township of McKim and the town of Copper Cliff. The rest of the original Sudbury riding was incorporated into the new riding of Nickel Belt.

In 1976, Sudbury's growth in population led the riding to shrink further. It now included only the northern half of the city; the city's southern half was incorporated into Nickel Belt.

In 1996, it was redefined as the part of the City of Sudbury north of a line drawn from east to west along Highway 69, south along Long Lake Road, and west along the north boundary of the geographic Township of Broder.

In 2003, the riding expanded geographically to include the former town of Walden, now part of the city of Greater Sudbury. The remainder of the city continues to be part of the Nickel Belt riding.

This riding was left unchanged after the 2012 electoral redistribution.

Riding associations

Riding associations are the local branches of political parties:

Members of Parliament

This riding has elected the following Members of Parliament:

Election results

Note: NDP vote is compared to CCF vote in 1958 election.

See also
 List of Canadian federal electoral districts
 Past Canadian electoral districts

References

Notes

External links
Riding history from the Library of Parliament
 2011 results from Elections Canada
 Campaign expense data from Elections Canada

Ontario federal electoral districts
Politics of Greater Sudbury